Maxime Baila Lopez (born 4 December 1997) is a French professional footballer who plays as a defensive midfielder for Serie A club Sassuolo. 

Lopez is an academy graduate of Marseille, having made his professional debut in August 2016 and appeared in 150 games for the side. He signed for Sassuolo in 2021 following a loan deal at the club. He also represented France internationally at youth level.

Club career

Marseille

Early career
Born in Marseille, Maxime Lopez is a product of Olympique de Marseille's football academy, having joined in 2010 from F.C. Burel. During his time in the academy he represented the club at U-19 level in the UEFA Youth League. He signed his first professional contract with Marseille on 12 July 2014, and was handed his non-competitive debut by interim manager Franck Passi on the same date two years later in a friendly encounter with Lausanne Sport.

2016–17 season
Lopez made his senior debut for Marseille on 21 August 2016, coming on as a 60th-minute substitute for Bouna Sarr in a 2–1 Ligue 1 away defeat to Guingamp and, just 18-minutes after entering the field of play, assisted Florian Thauvin for Marseille's only goal. His home debut at the Stade Vélodrome came on 16 October in Marseille's 1–0 Ligue 1 win over Metz. Later that month, on 30 October, he made his first start for Marseille in a 0–0 Ligue 1 home draw with Bordeaux. On 20 November, Lopez made 129 touches during Marseille's 1-0 Ligue 1 home win against Caen, which was the most ever by a Marseille player in a single match in recorded history. He then scored the first goal of his senior club career on 10 December, netting the opening goal in Marseille's 2–1 Ligue 1 away victory over Dijon. Lopez was later named Ligue 1 Player of the Month in recognition of his performances throughout the month of December. On 30 April 2017, he scored twice in a 5–1 Ligue 1 away win over Caen, thereby becoming the youngest Marseille player in 30 years to score a brace in Ligue 1. He ultimately made 35 appearances across all competitions and scored three times in his debut season with Marseille.

2017–18 season

The following season, Lopez temporarily retained his starting berth in Marseille's midfield under coach Rudi Garcia, but lost his position following a dip in form during the campaign's opening matches. On 19 October 2017, he scored his first and only goal of the season, and his first ever in European competitions, when he netted in a 2–1 Europa League group-stage win over Vitória de Guimarães. He made his 50th league appearance for Marseille on 15 April 2018 in a 3–2 victory over Troyes. He continued to feature regularly in the club's Europa League campaign and helped the side reach the final of the competition, where he appeared as a substitute in a 3–0 loss to Spanish side, Atlético Madrid.

2018–19 season
Lopez scored his first goal of the following campaign, and his first in the league since April 2017, in a 1–1 draw with Monaco on 15 January 2019. His performance earned him the man of the match award and saw him named as the highest performing player in the league over the weekend. The following week, he made his 100th appearance for the club in a 2–1 league loss to Saint-Étienne.

Sassuolo
On 5 October 2020, Lopez joined Serie A club Sassuolo on a season-long loan with option to buy. The deal was made permanent in April 2021 after he had played over 30 minutes in 20 Serie A games, triggering an obligation to buy from Marseille. Lopez's contract at Sassuolo would now keep him at the club until June 2025.

Style of play
Due to his Algerian lineage and similar progression through Marseille's academy, Lopez has often been likened to former Marseille midfielder Samir Nasri. Though small in stature, Lopez has been described as a versatile playmaker capable of fluid movement and quick and intelligent passing.

Personal life
Lopez was born in France to a French father of partially Spanish origin, and an Algerian mother. His older brother, Julien is also a footballer who plays in the Ligue 2 with Paris FC and was a youth international for Algeria.

Career statistics

Honours
Marseille
UEFA Europa League runner-up: 2017–2018

Individual
 UNFP Player of the Month: December 2016

References

External links
 
 
 Marseille profile
 
 

1997 births
Living people
French footballers
Footballers from Marseille
Association football midfielders
Ligue 1 players
Championnat National 2 players
Championnat National 3 players
Serie A players
Olympique de Marseille players
U.S. Sassuolo Calcio players
France under-21 international footballers
France youth international footballers
French sportspeople of Algerian descent
French people of Spanish descent
French expatriate footballers
French expatriate sportspeople in Italy
Expatriate footballers in Italy